Paulina Flores may refer to:

 Paulina Flores (model) (born 1980), Mexican fashion model
 Paulina Flores (writer) (born 1988), Chilean writer